The Hundred of Witera is a cadastral hundred of the County of Robinson in South Australia.

History
The traditional owners of the area are the Wirangu and Nauo people. In 1802 Matthew Flinders. Flinders named Streaky Bay whilst on his voyage in the Investigator. The first European land exploration was that of John Hill and Samuel Stephens in 1839, followed by Edward John Eyre in the same year.

Climate

References

Witera